Macrozamia plurinervia is a species of plant in the family Zamiaceae. It is endemic to Australia. Its natural habitat is subtropical or tropical dry forests.

References

plurinervia
Flora of New South Wales
Flora of Queensland
Cycadophyta of Australia
Endemic flora of Australia
Least concern flora of Australia
Near threatened biota of Queensland
Taxonomy articles created by Polbot